The Battle of Medan, known locally as the Battle for the Medan Area was a battle between Allied forces and the Indonesian Army in Medan, North Sumatra, and its surrounding area during the Indonesian National Revolution.

Prelude
As the Second World War neared its end, the Allies agreed that post-war, the Dutch East Indies would come under the authority of the South East Asia Command headed by British Admiral Lord Louis Mountbatten. Following the surrender of Japan, British troops began landing in Sumatra and Java to release prisoners-of-war, repatriate Japanese troops and maintain law and order pending the return of the Dutch colonial authorities. Meanwhile, on 17 August 1945, Sukarno proclaimed Indonesia independence in Jakarta, and appointed Muhammad Hasan as governor of Sumatra. However, news of the proclamation was only announced by Hasan in Medan on 30 September. The Allies, who had just liberated Indonesia from its Japanese occupation, landed in Belawan on 9 October 1945 and proceeded to Medan under the leadership of Brigadier-General T.E.D Kelly, with the intention of reestablishing Dutch rule over the islands. Allied troops from the British Raj and the Netherlands were soon joined by the NICA, in preparation for a Dutch takeover. The arrival of the Allies and the NICA angered many local Indonesians, who saw this as an attack on their country's new sovereignty.

Battle
On 13 October 1945, the Indonesian Army launched attacks against troops from the Allies and the NICA in an effort to seize government buildings formerly occupied by the Japanese. The British delegation issued an ultimatum to the Indonesian people to disarm and hand over their weapons to the Allies, which was promptly ignored.

On 1 December 1945, the Allies attempted to create a buffer zone and planted signs inscribed with the message "Fixed Medan Area Boundaries" in the outskirts of Medan. Nine days later, on 10 December 1945, the Allies and the NICA launched a massive attack against Indonesian troops stationed in Medan. The attack caused many casualties on both sides. In April 1946, the Allies succeeded in occupying Medan, and Indonesian forces retreated to Pemantangsiantar.

Aftermath
Indonesia's local government established the People's Army Commando Regiment of Medan in order to continue their resistance against the Allies. Commander Initerus led troops in an insurgency against the Allies in Medan until the end of Dutch rule in Indonesia in 1949.

Notes

References
 
 
 
 
 
 
 

Indonesian National Revolution
Battles of the Indonesian National Revolution
1945 in Indonesia
1946 in Indonesia
Medan